Under the Red Sky is the 27th studio album by American singer-songwriter Bob Dylan, released on September 10, 1990, by Columbia Records. It was produced by Don Was, David Was, and Dylan (under the pseudonym Jack Frost).

The album was largely greeted as a disappointing follow-up to 1989's critically acclaimed Oh Mercy. Most of the criticism was directed at the slick sound of rock producer Don Was, as well as a handful of tracks that seem rooted in children's nursery rhymes. It is a rarity in Dylan's catalog for its inclusion of celebrity cameos by Jimmie Vaughan, Slash, Elton John, George Harrison, David Crosby, Stevie Ray Vaughan, and Bruce Hornsby.

Dedication
The album is dedicated to "Gabby Goo Goo", now thought to be Desiree Gabrielle Dennis-Dylan, Dylan's daughter by Carolyn Dennis, born on January 31, 1986.

Recording
Four songs from the album, "Handy Dandy", "10,000 Men", "God Knows", and "Cat's in the Well", were recorded in a single session in Los Angeles on 6 January 1990, before Dylan commenced a four-week tour.  ("Handy Dandy" received overdubs subsequently.) Dylan biographer Clinton Heylin writes that Dylan finished recording the basic tracks for the album in mid-March 1990, but added new vocals to some tracks the following month, with instrumental overdub sessions extending into May 1990.

Unlike the rest of his discography, the album features numerous guest appearances by established artists, such as Bruce Hornsby, Elton John and George Harrison. Additionally, session musicians like pianist Al Kooper and guitarist Waddy Wachtel appear throughout the album. The album opener, "Wiggle Wiggle", also features Slash on guitar, while "10,000 Men" features Stevie Ray Vaughan. The title track features a "fine guitar solo" by George Harrison; Heylin has called this track an "important song", noting that it has been a staple of Dylan's live performances.

Two songs, "Born in Time" and "God Knows", are reworkings of material originally recorded at the previous year's Oh Mercy sessions. Versions of these songs from the Oh Mercy sessions are included on The Bootleg Series Vol. 8: Tell Tale Signs.

According to producer Don Was, there were two outtakes from the album: "Shirley Temple Doesn't Live Here Anymore" (which Dylan co-wrote with Was and David Weiss) and "Heartland" (which Dylan later sang with Willie Nelson on Nelson's 1993 album Across the Borderline). "Shirley Temple Doesn't Live Here Anymore" was later recorded by Don Was's group Was (Not Was) for their 2008 album Boo! as "Mr. Alice Doesn't Live Here Anymore".

Reception

Dylan has echoed most critics' complaints, telling Rolling Stone in a 2006 interview that the album's shortcomings resulted from hurried and unfocused recording sessions, due in part to his activity with the Traveling Wilburys at the time. He also claimed that there were too many people working on the album, and that he was very disillusioned with the recording industry during this period of his career.

Dylan critic Patrick Humphries, author of The Complete Guide to the Music of Bob Dylan, was particularly harsh in his assessment of Under the Red Sky, stating the album "was everything Oh Mercy wasn't—sloppily written songs, lazily performed and unimaginatively produced. The first bridge of "2 X 2" ("How much poison did they inhale?") was reminiscent of the menace which pervaded Oh Mercy, but otherwise, where before there had been certainty and sureness, here was confusion and indecision."

Humphries saved his harshest attack for the album's opening song, "Wiggle Wiggle":

The album did have some critical support, particularly from Robert Christgau of The Village Voice, who wrote: "To my astonishment, I think Under the Red Sky is Dylan's best album in 15 years, a record that may even signal a ridiculously belated if not totally meaningless return to form … It's fabulistic, biblical … the tempos are postpunk like it oughta be, with [Kenny] Aronoff's sprints and shuffles grooving ahead like '60s folk-rock never did." And Paul Nelson, writing for Musician, called the album "a deliberately throwaway masterpiece". When the Voice held its Pazz & Jop Critics Poll for 1990, Under the Red Sky placed at #39.

In the end, album sales were disappointing, peaking at #38 on the US charts and #13 in the UK. According to the book Down The Highway: The Life Of Bob Dylan, the disappointing record sales of this album made him depressed. On top of that, Dylan's second wife had just signed for divorce in August 1990, although their marriage was completely unknown to both Dylan's fans and the media until the 2001 publication of Down the Highway: The Life of Bob Dylan by Howard Sounes.

Legacy
Dylan continued the style of the album with his recording of the nursery rhyme "This Old Man", which was released on the Disney charity album For Our Children in 1991. For his follow-up album, Good As I Been to You (1992), Dylan went back to his acoustic roots, recording more serious songs.

In 2005, Q included the lead-off track "Wiggle Wiggle" in a list of "Ten Terrible Records by Great Artists". Time placed "Wiggle Wiggle" on the list of The 10 Worst Bob Dylan Songs, noting that it "sounds like the theme song to one of those tripped-out television shows beloved by toddlers and drug users". The song was covered on the 2014 tribute album Bob Dylan in the 80s: Volume One by Slash and Aaron Freeman. Its lyrics were also the namesake for the Danish pop/rock band Big Fat Snake.

Track listing

Personnel
Bob Dylan – acoustic guitar, electric guitar, piano, accordion, harmonica, vocals, production

Additional musicians

Kenny Aronoff – drums
Sweet Pea Atkinson – backing vocals
Rayse Biggs – trumpet
Sir Harry Bowens – backing vocals
David Crosby – backing vocals
Paulinho Da Costa – percussion
George Harrison – slide guitar
Slash – guitar "Wiggle Wiggle"
Bruce Hornsby, Elton John – piano
Randy "The Emperor" Jackson – bass guitar
Al Kooper – Hammond organ, keyboards
David Lindley – bouzouki, guitar, slide guitar
David McMurray – saxophone
Donald Ray Mitchell – backing vocals
Jamie Muhoberac – Hammond organ
Jimmie Vaughan, Stevie Ray Vaughan, Waddy Wachtel, Robben Ford – guitar
David Was – backing vocals, production
Don Was – bass guitar, production

Production

Dan Bosworth – assistant engineering
Marsha Burns – production coordination
Ed Cherney – engineering, mixing
Steve Deutsch – assistant engineering
Judy Kirshner – assistant engineering
Jim Mitchell – assistant engineering
Brett Swain – assistant engineering

Certifications

References

External links
 Lyrics at Bob Dylan's official site
 Chords at Dylanchords

Further reading 
 

1990 albums
Albums produced by Bob Dylan
Albums produced by David Was
Albums produced by Don Was
Bob Dylan albums
Columbia Records albums